Ina (written: 伊奈) is a Japanese surname. Notable people with the surname include:

, Japanese photographer
Jana Ina (born 1976), Brazilian television host and model
, Japanese actor
, Japanese-American figure skater
, Japanese shogi player

Japanese-language surnames